The Liberation of Saint Peter is a fresco painting by the Italian High Renaissance artist Raphael. It was painted in 1514 as part of Raphael's commission to decorate with frescoes the rooms that are now known as the Stanze di Raffaello, in the Apostolic Palace in the Vatican. It is located in the Stanza di Eliodoro, which is named after The Expulsion of Heliodorus from the Temple. The painting shows how Saint Peter was liberated from Herod's prison by an angel, as described in Acts 12.  It is technically an overdoor.

The fresco shows three scenes in symmetrical balance formed by the feigned architecture and stairs. In the centre the angel wakes Peter, and on the right guides him past the sleeping guards.  On the left side one guard has apparently noticed the light generated by the angel and wakes a comrade, pointing up to the miraculously illumined cell.  This adds drama to the serene exit of Peter at the right.

Gallery

References

External links
The Vatican: spirit and art of Christian Rome, a book from The Metropolitan Museum of Art Libraries (fully available online as PDF), which contains material on this work 

1514 paintings
Raphael rooms
Paintings depicting Saint Peter